Harry Wilson (1873 – 13 August 1906) was an English first-class cricketer, who played in six matches for Worcestershire in the early 20th century.

He was born in Yorkshire, and played for the county's Colts side before moving south. For Worcestershire, he made his debut against the touring South Africans in 1901, but his most notable achievement was to take 6–86 on his County Championship debut against Surrey in June 1903, albeit in a game Worcestershire lost by an innings. His first victim was the 45-year-old Bobby Abel, then nearing the end of his long career. Wilson took 4–67 against Kent a few days later, but picked up only three more wickets in the rest of his short career.

Wilson's last match was also against Kent, in July 1906; barely a month later he was dead, aged only 32 or 33. He died in Kidderminster, Worcestershire.

External links
 

1873 births
1906 deaths
English cricketers
Worcestershire cricketers
Sportspeople from Kidderminster